Corymbia pauciseta is a species of small tree that is endemic to north-eastern Arnhem Land in the Northern Territory. It has rough, tessellated bark on part or all of the trunk, smooth white bark above, a crown of intermediate and adult leaves, flower buds in groups of seven, creamy white flowers and cylindrical to barrel-shaped fruit.

Description
It has rough, grey, tessellated bark on some or all of the trunk, smooth creamy white to pale grey bark above. The tree usually loses its leaves in the dry season. Flowering has been observed in October and November and the flowers are creamy white.

Taxonomy and naming
Corymbia pauciseta was first formally described in 1995 by Ken Hill and Lawrie Johnson. The specific epithet (pauciseta) is from the Latin paucus meaning "few" and seta "bristle", referring to the leaves and shoots of this species compared to those of Corymbia confertiflora.

Distribution and habitat
This eucalypt mainly grows in low woodland usually in flat places. It is locally common but occurs sporadically in the north-eastern Northern Territory, between Maningrida and Gove but mainly in Arnhem Land.

See also
 List of Corymbia species

References

pauciseta
Myrtales of Australia
Flora of the Northern Territory
Plants described in 1995